Glyphodes oriolalis is a moth of the family Crambidae. It is found on the Comoros (Grand Comoro).

Its wingspan is 29 mm, with a length of the forewings of 14mm.

References

Moths described in 1958
Glyphodes
Moths of the Comoros
Endemic fauna of the Comoros